The 2019 American League Championship Series was a best-of-seven series between the two winners of the 2019 American League Division Series, the Houston Astros and New York Yankees, for the American League (AL) pennant and the right to play in the 2019 World Series. The Astros defeated the Yankees in six games, advancing to face the 2019 National League champions, the Washington Nationals, whom they lost to in seven games.

The series was played in a 2–3–2 format, with the Astros, having the better regular season record, hosting the first two and last two (if necessary) games. The series was the 50th in league history, with Fox/FS1 televising all games in the United States.

For the third straight year, Major League Baseball sold presenting sponsorships to all of its postseason series; as with the NLCS, this ALCS was sponsored by GEICO and officially known as the 2019 American League Championship Series presented by GEICO.

Background
The best-of-five American League Division Series were scheduled for October 4–10.

The top-seeded Houston Astros won their first two games against the Tampa Bay Rays, winner of the American League Wild Card Game. The Rays won the next two games to force a deciding Game 5, which Houston won to advance to their third straight ALCS; each game of the series was won by the home team. Houston was 1–1 in prior ALCS appearances. When they competed in the National League, Houston was 1–3 in NLCS appearances.

The second-seeded New York Yankees swept their series against the third-seeded Minnesota Twins to clinch their 17th ALCS appearance. New York was 11–5 in prior ALCS appearances.

This series was a sequel to the 2017 ALCS, which the Astros won in seven games, and the third overall postseason meeting between the two teams. The Astros and Yankees faced each other seven times during the 2019 regular season, with the Astros winning four of those games.

Summary

Game summaries

Game 1

Game 1 starting pitchers were Masahiro Tanaka for the Yankees and Zack Greinke for the Astros. The Yankees scored first with Gleyber Torres driving in DJ LeMahieu in the top of the fourth inning. They added two runs in the top of the sixth, on home runs by Torres and Giancarlo Stanton, and added two more runs in the top of the seventh, via four consecutive two-out singles, with Torres collecting two more RBIs. In the top of the ninth, the Yankees extended their lead to 7–0, via a leadoff homer by Gio Urshela and another RBI by Torres, this one coming on a fielder's choice, as LeMahieu scored from third on a groundout. Jonathan Loáisiga concluded matters, pitching the bottom of the ninth, with the game ending on a Michael Brantley fly out to Cameron Maybin as the Yankees took a 1–0 series lead. Tanaka earned the win, allowing just one hit while striking out four and facing the minimum in his six innings (18 batters). Greinke was charged with the loss, allowing three runs on seven hits in six innings while striking out six.

Game 2

Game 2 starting pitchers were James Paxton for New York and Justin Verlander for Houston. Houston scored first, as Carlos Correa doubled in Alex Bregman who had singled to lead off the bottom of the second inning. Yankees manager Aaron Boone removed Paxton after  innings—Paxton had allowed one run on four hits while striking out three. The Yankees took a 2–1 lead in the fourth, with Aaron Judge homering after DJ LeMahieu had walked. Houston tied the game in the fifth, on a home run by George Springer. Verlander departed after  innings, having allowed two runs on five hits while striking out seven. With no further scoring through regulation, the game went to extra innings. After a scoreless tenth inning, Correa led off the 11th with a home run off J. A. Happ to give the Astros a 3–2 win and tie the series at 1, going into Yankee Stadium for the next three games.

Game 3

Game 3 starting pitchers were Gerrit Cole for the Astros and Luis Severino for the Yankees. The Astros scored first on a home run by José Altuve in the first inning. Josh Reddick followed with another homer in the second. The game was delayed by 20 minutes before the top of the fifth inning, as home plate umpire Jeff Nelson had to leave the game, due to the effects of being hit by a foul ball during the top of the fourth inning; Kerwin Danley, who had been the second base umpire, took over behind the plate. Severino left the game in the fifth inning after allowing two runs on five hits, walking three and striking out six in  innings. Houston added two runs in the seventh on a wild pitch by Yankee relief pitcher Zack Britton that allowed Altuve to score, and a sacrifice fly by Yuli Gurriel that scored Michael Brantley. Cole pitched seven shutout innings for the Astros, allowing four hits with five walks and seven strikeouts. Gleyber Torres put the Yankees on the board in the eighth inning with a home run off Joe Smith. Houston closer Roberto Osuna pitched a perfect ninth inning for his first save of the postseason.

Game 4

Game 4 was originally scheduled for October 16, but was postponed and rescheduled to October 17 due to the "bomb cyclone" that hit the Northeast. Umpire Jeff Nelson was removed from the umpiring crew after tests indicated he suffered a concussion during Game 3; he was replaced by Mike Everitt. 

The Yankees scored once in the first inning, forcing in a run with two walks after having runners on first and second with two out. The Astros took a 3–1 lead in the third inning, via a three-run home run by George Springer. Houston starting pitcher Zack Greinke exited after  innings, having allowing one run on three hits and striking out five. New York starter Masahiro Tanaka was removed one batter into the sixth inning; he was replaced by Chad Green, who gave up a three-run home run to Carlos Correa three batters later. Tanaka was charged with four runs on four hits, while striking out one. A two-run home run by Gary Sánchez in the bottom of the sixth cut the Astros' lead to 6–3. A double by Alex Bregman followed by two Yankee errors gave the Astros a run in the eighth. With runners on first and third and nobody out, Yankee left-hander CC Sabathia entered the game in relief of Adam Ottavino and threw 20 pitches to five batters, retiring two, before leaving with a shoulder injury to a standing ovation from fans and players on both teams. The Yankees removed Sabathia from their roster the next day, rendering him ineligible to pitch in the World Series and ending his storied 19-year career. Houston extended their lead to 8–3 in the ninth inning, on an error, wild pitch, and single. The Yankees were unable to score in the bottom of the ninth, as Roberto Osuna concluded matters by retiring Gleyber Torres on a flyout to Springer and the Astros were a victory away from playing Washington in the World Series.

Game 5

Game 5 was originally scheduled for October 17, but was rescheduled to October 18 when Game 4 was postponed. Pitcher CC Sabathia, who had left Game 4 with a shoulder injury, was removed from the Yankees' postseason roster and replaced by Ben Heller.

The Astros took an early 1–0 lead, as George Springer led off the game with an infield single, went to second on a passed ball, advanced to third on a ground out, and then scored on a wild pitch. DJ LeMahieu tied the game with a home run to lead off the bottom of the first, followed four batters later by an Aaron Hicks three-run homer that hit the right-field foul pole to give the Yankees a 4–1 lead. New York starting pitcher James Paxton left after six innings, having allowed one run on four hits while striking out nine. Houston starter Justin Verlander went seven innings, striking out nine while allowing four runs on five hits, and suffered the loss. With no scoring other than in the first inning, Aroldis Chapman set down the side in order in the top of the ninth, earning his second save this postseason, as he retired Springer on a groundout to Gio Urshela to send the series back to Houston and extend the Yankees' season. This was the first game in MLB postseason history (1,609 games) that both teams scored in the first inning, then were held scoreless the rest of the game.

Game 6

In a "bullpen game", the starting pitchers were Brad Peacock, who had pitched a scoreless eighth inning in Game 5 for Houston, and Chad Green for New York. Yuli Gurriel gave Houston an early lead, with a three-run homer in the bottom of the first inning. Green left after the first inning, having allowed three runs on two hits, while recording one strikeout. The Yankees closed to 3–1 in the second inning, after Didi Gregorius doubled and Gary Sánchez hit an RBI single with two out. Peacock left after  innings, having allowed a run on two hits while striking out two batters. A Gio Urshela home run in the top of the fourth inning trimmed Houston's lead to 3–2. In the bottom of the sixth, Alex Bregman hit into a fielder's choice, scoring the fourth run for the Astros. In the top of the ninth inning, an Urshela single was followed two batters later by a DJ LeMahieu home run that tied the game at four. After George Springer extended the bottom of the ninth with a two-out walk, José Altuve hit a walk-off two-run home run off Aroldis Chapman to win the game and send the Astros to their second World Series in three years; it was also the second time in two years that Chapman gave up the winning hit in a tied ALCS game in the ninth inning. Altuve's pennant-winning homer was the fifth to end any LCS, after Chris Chambliss (1976 ALCS), Aaron Boone (2003 ALCS), Magglio Ordonez (2006 ALCS), and Travis Ishikawa (2014 NLCS).

During the trophy ceremony to present the league trophy, Jose Altuvé was named series MVP for Houston, becoming the first Astros position player to win the LCS MVP Award (all previous Astros to win the award were pitchers).

With this loss, the 2010s became the first decade since the 1910s not to have the Yankees play in a World Series, as their last appearance (and title) was in 2009, and the second decade that the Yankees did not win at least one World Series (lost to the Dodgers in 1981 in their only appearance in the World Series in the 1980s).

The Jose Altuve home run call
FS1, with Joe Buck:

ALTUVE! HAS JUST SENT THE ASTROS TO THE WORLD SERIES!

Aftermath
During clubhouse celebrations after the Astros won Game 6 of the 2019 ALCS, Astros assistant general manager Brandon Taubman taunted a group of nearby female reporters by aggressively praising Astros relief pitcher Roberto Osuna, an alleged domestic abuser. The Astros had received backlash after trading for Osuna near the 2018 trade deadline as he was serving a 75-game suspension after serious domestic violence accusations. Taubman, who was involved in the acquisition of Osuna, was defensive of Osuna's performance as a reliever and overall presence on the team. Taubman had previously complained about the fact that one of the reporters in the group had a practice of tweeting out a domestic violence hotline number whenever Osuna took the mound for the Astros. After the season, Taubman was placed on MLB's ineligible list through at least the end of the 2020 season as a result of his behavior.

The Astros would go on to lose the 2019 World Series to the National League Champion Washington Nationals in seven games with the road team winning all seven games, Washington won 1, 2, 6, and the deciding Game 7 at Minute Maid Park in Houston and Houston won all three games at Nationals Park in Washington, D.C.

On December 18, 2019, the Yankees signed free agent pitcher Gerrit Cole away from the Astros, only sparking the recent rivalry between the two clubs which started during the 2017 American League Championship Series.

The animosity between the two teams only grew stronger in January of the next year, due to the revelations of the Houston Astros sign stealing scandal during the 2017 season. Hours after MLB announced its findings, Astros owner Jim Crane fired Luhnow and Hinch, while a day later the Red Sox fired Alex Cora, who had been the bench coach for the 2017 Astros.  A week later, the New York Mets and Carlos Beltrán, who was hired as their manager in the 2019–2020 offseason, mutually agreed to part ways, as he was the only then-Astros player called out by name for his involvement in the scheme. It was speculated by fans, the media, and even Yankees players that the Astros possibly cheated during the 2019 ALCS, but those allegations were denied by the Astros and Commissioner Rob Manfred, and no proof was ever found to claim wrongdoing in the ALCS. 

Houston would replace Luhnow with Tampa Bay Rays vice president of baseball operations James Click, while veteran manager Dusty Baker took over for Hinch. Hinch and Cora would find work shortly after their season long suspensions ended, as Hinch became the manager of the Detroit Tigers and Cora was re-hired by the Red Sox. While Beltran has not found a major league manager job, he was hired in 2022 to broadcast games for the Yankees. 

While the Yankees signed a current ace in Gerrit Cole during the off-season, their former ace C.C. Sabathia retired at the season’s end. His Game 4 relief appearance was the last of his career.

The Astros and Yankees nearly met again for a chance at the American League pennant for the third time in four years, but the Yankees lost to the Rays in a winner-take-all elimination game in the 2020 American League Division Series. In that series, Aroldis Chapman also gave up a game- and-series clinching home run to Rays outfielder Mike Brosseau in the 8th inning. The Rays beat the Astros in the ALCS that year, but Houston rebounded in 2021 with a victory over the Boston Red Sox (who had beaten the Yankees in the Wild Card Game) in six games in the ALCS to become the first AL team to make three World Series appearances in a five year span since the Yankees in the early 21st century. However, the Astros were defeated in the 2021 World Series by the Braves. 

Houston would continue their domination over New York in October, sweeping them in the 2022 American League Championship Series, and giving them four postseason series victories over New York since 2015. They later defeated the Philadelphia Phillies in the 2022 World Series, giving them their second championship in franchise history.

See also
 2019 National League Championship Series

Notes

References

Further reading

External links
 2019 American League Championship Series at Baseball Reference

American League Championship Series
American League Championship Series
Houston Astros postseason
New York Yankees postseason
American League Championship Series
American League Championship Series
American League Championship Series
American League Championship Series
2010s in the Bronx